SunOpta, Inc. is a multi-national food and mineral company headquartered in Eden Prairie, Minnesota and founded in 1973 in Canada.

Overview
Plant-based beverages include soymilk, almond milk, oatmilk and broths among others. The company produces these shelf-stable beverages for retailers as well as branded food companies. The company specializes in sourcing, processing and packaging of natural and organic food products, integrated from seed through packaged products. The company’s core natural and organic food operations focus on grains and fruit based products.  In 2007, SunOpta Inc acquired the Dutch organic ingredients trader Tradin Organic Agriculture.

References

Companies listed on the Toronto Stock Exchange
Companies listed on the Nasdaq
Organic farming organizations